The Dodrill–GMR machine was the first operational mechanical heart successfully used while performing open heart surgery.  It was developed by Dr. Forest Dewey Dodrill, a surgeon at Harper University Hospital in Detroit, and General Motors Research.

On July 3, 1952, 41-year-old Henry Opitek suffering from shortness of breath made medical history at Harper University Hospital in Michigan. The Dodrill–GMR heart machine, considered by some to be the first operational mechanical heart was successfully used while performing heart surgery. The machine performs the functions of the heart, allowing doctors to detour blood and stop the heart of a patient during an operation. The machine is external of the body and is only used during an operation. Dr. Forest Dewey Dodrill, a surgeon at Wayne State University's Harper Hospital in Detroit, developed the machine with funding from The American Heart Association and volunteer engineers from General Motors.

Dr. Dodrill used the machine in 1952 to bypass Henry Opitek’s left ventricle for 50 minutes while he opened the patient's left atrium and worked to repair the mitral valve. In Dodrill’s post operative report he notes, “To our knowledge, this is the first instance of survival of a patient when a mechanical heart mechanism was used to take over the complete body function of maintaining the blood supply of the body while the heart was open and operated on".

External links
50th Anniversary of First Open Heart Surgery
DMC Harper University Hospital

References

Medical equipment
Wayne State University